Nazanin (also Romanized as "Nāzanīn") and also spelt Nazenin, is a Persian female given name in Iran, Azerbaijan, Afghanistan and Turkey. It means "sweetheart", "lovely", "darling", or "delightful". Notable people with the name include:

Nazanin Afshin-Jam, Iranian-born Canadian human rights activist, singer/songwriter, Miss World Canada 2003
Nazanin Aghakhani, Austrian-born orchestral conductor
Nazenin Ansari, Iranian journalist
Nazanin Bassiri-Gharb, mechanical engineer in the U.S.
Nazanin Boniadi, Iranian-born British actress and an official spokesperson for Amnesty International
Nazanin Fatehi, Iranian woman sentenced to death for stabbing her attacker
Nazanin Mandi, American model, actress, and singer
Nazanin Nour, Iranian American actress and writer
Nazanin Zaghari-Ratcliffe, 2016–2022 British-Iranian prisoner in Iran

Persian feminine given names
Pakistani feminine given names